Hope is a small unincorporated community in the deserts of La Paz County, Arizona, United States.  Its name was inspired by the community's hope for increased business after merchants visited the town.  Today, it consists of one RV park, one gas station, one church, and one antique store.

Unincorporated communities in La Paz County, Arizona
Unincorporated communities in Arizona